Seoul Airport may refer to one of the following airports serving Seoul, South Korea:

Incheon International Airport , the long-haul international hub
Gimpo International Airport , the domestic hub which also serves some short-haul international routes
Seoul Air Base , a military airbase
Yeouido Airport, a former airport served from 1916 to 1971